The 2021 Clean Harbors 100 at The Glen was the 13th stock car race of the 2021 ARCA Menards Series season, the seventh race of the 2021 Sioux Chief Showdown, and the 21st iteration of the event. The race was held on Friday, August 6, 2021, in Watkins Glen, New York at Watkins Glen International, a  permanent road course. The race took the scheduled 41 laps to complete. At race's end, Corey Heim of Venturini Motorsports would take control in the later half of the race to win his sixth career ARCA Menards Series win and his fifth of the season. To fill out the podium, Austin Hill of Hattori Racing Enterprises and Ty Gibbs of Joe Gibbs Racing would finish second and third, respectively.

Background 

Watkins Glen International (nicknamed "The Glen") is an automobile race track located in Watkins Glen, New York at the southern tip of Seneca Lake. It was long known around the world as the home of the Formula One United States Grand Prix, which it hosted for twenty consecutive years (1961–1980), but the site has been home to road racing of nearly every class, including the World Sportscar Championship, Trans-Am, Can-Am, NASCAR Sprint Cup Series, the International Motor Sports Association and the IndyCar Series.

Initially, public roads in the village were used for the race course. In 1956 a permanent circuit for the race was built. In 1968 the race was extended to six hours, becoming the 6 Hours of Watkins Glen. The circuit's current layout has more or less been the same since 1971, although a chicane was installed at the uphill Esses in 1975 to slow cars through these corners, where there was a fatality during practice at the 1973 United States Grand Prix. The chicane was removed in 1985, but another chicane called the "Inner Loop" was installed in 1992 after J.D. McDuffie's fatal accident during the previous year's NASCAR Winston Cup event.

The circuit is known as the Mecca of North American road racing and is a very popular venue among fans and drivers. The facility is currently owned by International Speedway Corporation.

Entry list 

*Withdrew due to Purdy contracting COVID-19.

Practice/Qualifying 
Practice and qualifying would be combined for the event. The session would take place on Friday, August 6, at 3:15 PM EST. Each driver would have 45 minutes to run their fastest lap.

Full qualifying results

Race results

References 

2021 ARCA Menards Series
NASCAR races at Watkins Glen International
Clean Harbors 100 at The Glen
Clean Harbors 100 at The Glen